The seventh season of Married at First Sight premiered on 3 February 2020 on the Nine Network. Relationship experts John Aiken, Mel Schilling and Trisha Stratford all returned from the previous season to match 11 brides and 9 grooms together. The show cast their first same-sex couple since marriage equality laws were passed in Australia. Halfway through the experiment, the experts matched another 2 brides and 2 grooms together, including Elizabeth Sobinoff who previously appeared in season 6.

Couple profiles

Commitment ceremony history

  This couple left the experiment outside of commitment ceremony.
  This couple elected to leave the experiment during the commitment ceremony.
  This couple was removed from the experiment by the experts.

Controversy
Having discovered that his partner had cheated on him with another groom, David Cannon used wife Hayley Vernon's toothbrush to clean their toilet. The incident caused production to be shut down for a short time while producers dealt with both scandals. At the following commitment ceremony, the experts decided to remove Hayley and David from the experiment due to their toxic behaviour towards each other.

Ratings

References

7
2020 Australian television seasons
Television shows filmed in Australia